Abingdon is a city in Knox County, Illinois, United States,  west of Peoria. It is part of the Galesburg Micropolitan Statistical Area. The city was first settled in 1828 and was incorporated in 1857. In june of 1907, the patent for the common spring-loaded mousetrap was awarded to William Hooker William Armstrong and Knox Mark of Abingdon. The population was 3,319 at the 2010 census, down from 3,612 at the 2000 census.

History
Abingdon was laid out in 1836 and named after Abingdon, Maryland, the native home of a first settler.

Geography
Abingdon is located in southwestern Knox County at  (40.803572, -90.400770). Illinois Route 41 passes through the center of the city, leading north  to Galesburg, the county seat, and south  to Bushnell.

Demographics

As of the census of 2000, there were 3,612 people, 1,422 households, and 984 families residing in the city. The racial makeup of the city was 98.12% White, 0.55% African American, 0.25% Native American, 0.11% Asian, 0.17% from other races, and 0.80% from two or more races. Hispanic or Latino of any race were 1.14% of the population.

There were 1,422 households, out of which 31.8% had children under the age of 18 living with them, 54.1% were married couples living together, 10.8% had a female householder with no husband present, and 30.8% were non-families. 26.2% of all households were made up of individuals, and 14.5% had someone living alone who was 65 years of age or older. The average household size was 2.50 and the average family size was 2.99.

In the city, the population was spread out, with 25.8% under the age of 18, 7.9% from 18 to 24, 27.7% from 25 to 44, 22.6% from 45 to 64, and 16.0% who were 65 years of age or older. The median age was 38 years. For every 100 females, there were 90.2 males. For every 100 females age 18 and over, there were 87.3 males.

The median income for a household in the city was $35,642, and the median income for a family was $40,337. Males had a median income of $31,042 versus $20,343 for females. The per capita income for the city was $15,711. About 6.2% of families and 9.9% of the population were below the poverty line, including 11.1% of those under age 18 and 13.5% of those age 65 or over.

Notable people 

 Robert Hugo Dunlap, captain and commanding officer, C Company, Iwo Jima; winner of Medal of Honor.
 William C. Hooker, inventor of the modern mousetrap
 James Stockdale, admiral in the U.S. Navy, winner of Medal of Honor

Schools
Until July 1, 2013, Abingdon's school district included Hedding Grade School, Abingdon Middle School, and Abingdon High School.

In November 2012 voters approved a school consolidation with Avon. Beginning July 1, 2013, the district became known as Abingdon-Avon CUSD #276. Abingdon is home to Hedding Grade School, which is a PK - 5 attendance center, and Abingdon-Avon High School. Avon also houses a PK - 5 elementary school and Abingdon-Avon Middle School, which serves students in grades 6 - 8.

Abingdon-Avon CUSD #276 serves nearly 1,000 students.

The high school enrollment is 289 students.  The students selected "Tornadoes" as the mascot and black, green, and yellow as the school colors.

Hedding College (1855–1930) was named after Methodist Bishop Elizah Hedding. The school merged with Illinois Wesleyan University in 1930.

References

Populated places established in 1828
Cities in Knox County, Illinois
Galesburg, Illinois micropolitan area
Cities in Illinois